The Concessions in Mandatory Palestine were a number of monopolies for the operation of key economic assets in Mandatory Palestine.

List of Concessions
The 1938 Woodhead Commission provided a list of the concessions granted:

Bodies of water
 the Dead Sea Concession (Moshe Novomeysky's Palestine Potash Company)
 the Jordan River Concession (Pinhas Rutenberg's Palestine Electric Corporation and the First Jordan Hydro-Electric Power House) 
 the Jerusalem Electric and Public Service Corporation (Euripides Mavrommatis; sold to Balfour Beatty in 1928)
 the Auja Concession (the Palestine Electric Corporation)
 the drainage of Lake Huleh and the adjacent marshes (first novated to the Syro-Ottoman Agricultural Company, then in 1934 transferred to the Palestine Land Development Company)
 the Kabbara Concession

Oil transport
 the Transit of Mineral Oils through Palestine and the Establishment of an Oil Refinery at Haifa (Anglo-Iranian Oil Company) ;
 the Transit of Mineral Oils through Palestine (the Iraq Petroleum Company).

Shipping infrastructure
 Lighthouses (Administration Generale de Phares de Palestine);
 Bonded Warehouses (Levant Bonded Warehouse Company);

Spas
 the Tiberias Hot Baths (the Hamei Tiberia Company);
 El Hamma Mineral Springs (Suleiman Bey Nassif);

References

Bibliography
 Saʼid B. Himadeh, 1938, Economic Organization Of Palestine
 

Mandatory Palestine
Former monopolies